Mir Sikandar Khan Khoso (1912–1975) was a poet, politician, and landowner from the Jacobabad District in Sindh, Pakistan. He was the youngest son of Mir Bahadur Khan Khoso.

He was a Sufi who entered politics with a vision to serve humanity after the death of his brother, Khan Sahib Shahal Khan Khoso. He introduced Mir Dariya Khan Khoso into politics by defeating Mir Jafar Khan Jamali.

Mir Sikandar Khan published his first book of Sufi lyrics under the name Subh Mein Punhoon Paan in 1973. The following lyrics were adapted into a kafi by the late musician Ustad Muhammad Juman in 1974 on Radio Pakistan in Hyderabad:
"Ishq munjhoon izhar thee ayo nehin karey nirwar thee ayo."

Pakistani Sufis
1975 deaths
1912 births